Articulata are a subclass or superorder within the class Crinoidea, including the only living crinoid species. They are commonly known as sea lilies (stalked crinoids) or feather stars (unstalked crinoids). The Articulata are differentiated from the extinct subclasses by their lack of an anal plate in the adult stage and the presence of an entoneural system. Articulata first appeared in the fossil record during the Triassic period although other, now extinct crinoid groups, originated in the Ordovician.

Characteristics
Articulata exhibit pentamerous symmetry. The stalk, which consists of numerous disks held together by ligaments, supports a calyx or cup made of circlets of calcerous plates. In Comatulids, the stalk develops following the larval stage, but the juveniles shed all but the topmost disk to take up a free-living existence. Five often branched arms, which consist of articulated series of ossicles, extend from the oral plate and form the food-capture mechanism of Articulata.  The arms of Articulata are pinnulate in that they have alternating pinnules branching out along them to effectively increase the surface area for feeding.  These pinnules all have ciliated ambulacral grooves that converge to form larger grooves in the arms that lead down to the mouth located beside the anus on the upper surface of the oral plate.

Articulata are passive suspension feeders. They capture algae with triplets of tube feet located on the pinnules, and the ciliated ambulacral canals transport this algae to the mouth.  Although they are passive feeders, some Articulata have been observed to move to better feeding areas either with locomotory mechanisms at the base of the stalk or by detaching and pulling themselves with their arms. As of 2004, there are 540 described species of living Articulata that fall into two major orders. The bourgueticrinids which have the traditional stalked body form account for about 15% percent of the known species while the comatulids are unstalked and account for most of the rest.

Classification
According to the World Register of Marine Species, Articulata includes the following families:

 order Comatulida Clark, 1908
 super-family Antedonoidea Norman, 1865
 family Antedonidae Norman, 1865
 family Pentametrocrinidae AH Clark, 1908
 family Zenometridae AH Clark, 1909
 super-family Atelecrinoidea Bather, 1899
 family Atelecrinidae Bather, 1899
 super-family Comatuloidea Fleming, 1828
 family Comatulidae Fleming, 1828
 super-family Himerometroidea AH Clark, 1908
 family Colobometridae AH Clark, 1909
 family Eudiocrinidae AH Clark, 1907
 family Himerometridae AH Clark, 1907
 family Mariametridae AH Clark, 1909
 family Zygometridae AH Clark, 1908
 super-family Notocrinoidea Mortensen, 1918
 family Aporometridae HL Clark, 1938
 family Notocrinidae Mortensen, 1918
 super-family †Paracomatuloidea Hess, 1951 
 super-family Tropiometroidea AH Clark, 1908
 family Asterometridae Gislén, 1924
 family Calometridae AH Clark, 1911
 family Charitometridae AH Clark, 1909
 family Ptilometridae AH Clark, 1914
 family Thalassometridae AH Clark, 1908
 family Tropiometridae AH Clark, 1908
 Comatulida incertae sedis
 family Atopocrinidae Messing, 2011 (in Hess & Messing, 2011)
 family Bathycrinidae Bather, 1899
 family Bourgueticrinidae Loriol, 1882
 family Guillecrinidae Mironov & Sorokina, 1998
 family Phrynocrinidae AH Clark, 1907
 family Septocrinidae Mironov, 2000
 order Cyrtocrinida
 Sub-order Cyrtocrinina
 family Sclerocrinidae Jaekel, 1918
 Sub-order Holopodina
 family Eudesicrinidae Bather, 1899
 family Holopodidae Zittel, 1879
 order †Encrinida
 family †Encrinidae
 order Hyocrinida
 family Hyocrinidae Carpenter, 1884
 order Isocrinida
 Sub-order Isocrinina
 family Cainocrinidae Simms, 1988
 family Isocrinidae Gislén, 1924
 family Isselicrinidae Klikushkin, 1977
 family Proisocrinidae Rasmussen, 1978
 Sub-order †Pentacrinitina
 family †Pentacrinitidae Gray, 1842
 order †Millericrinida

References

 
Deuterostome subclasses
Triassic first appearances